Mangodara is a town in the Mangodara Department of Comoé Province in south-western Burkina Faso. It is the capital of Mangodara Department and the town has a population of 5,000.

References

External links
Satellite map at Maplandia.com

Populated places in the Cascades Region
Comoé Province